KSL City is an integrated shopping mall development in Taman Abad, Johor Bahru, Johor, Malaysia.

History
The shopping mall was opened on 12 December 2010.

Architecture
The complex comprises a shopping mall and two identical towers of KSL Resort Hotel. The shopping mall consists of 500 retail outlets, a theater and a water theme park, while the two towers consists of 904 hotel rooms and 602 condominiums, and include 2,800 car parks. Its net leasing area is 55,742 km2.

Business
The shopping mall was developed by KSL Holdings Bhd. under its property investment division.

Transportation
The shopping mall is accessible by Causeway Link bus route S1.

See also
 List of shopping malls in Malaysia

References

External links

 

2010 establishments in Malaysia
Shopping malls established in 2010
Shopping malls in Johor Bahru